In fluid dynamics, the Iribarren number or Iribarren parameter – also known as the surf similarity parameter and breaker parameter – is a dimensionless parameter used to model several effects of (breaking) surface gravity waves on beaches and coastal structures. The parameter is named after the Spanish engineer Ramón Iribarren Cavanilles (1900–1967), who introduced it to describe the occurrence of wave breaking on sloping beaches.

For instance, the Iribarren number is used to describe breaking wave types on beaches; or wave run-up on – and reflection by – beaches, breakwaters and dikes.

Definition 

The Iribarren number which is often denoted as Ir or ξ – is defined as:

  with  

where ξ is the Iribarren number,  is the angle of the seaward slope of a structure, H is the wave height, L0 is the deep-water wavelength, T is the period and g is the gravitational acceleration. Depending on the application, different definitions of H and T are used, for example: for periodic waves the wave height H0 at deep water or the breaking wave height Hb at the edge of the surf zone. Or, for random waves, the significant wave height Hs at a certain location.

Breaker types 

The type of breaking wave – spilling, plunging, collapsing or surging – depends on the Iribarren number.

  or  

where H0 is the offshore wave height in deep water, and Hb is the value of the wave height at the break point (where the waves start to break). Then the breaker types dependence on the Iribarren number (either ξ0 or ξb) is approximately:

References

Footnotes

Other 

 
 
 
 
 

Water waves
Dimensionless numbers of fluid mechanics
Coastal engineering